George Michael Bedinger (December 10, 1756 – December 7, 1843) was an American military officer and politician who came to oppose the expansion of slavery to Kentucky He served in both houses of the Kentucky legislature and in the U.S. Representative from Kentucky. His nephew Henry Bedinger became a pro-slavery congressman from Virginia.

Early and family life
Born Dec. 10, 1756 in Hanover, Pennsylvania, the son of Henry Bedinger (1729-1772) and Magdelena Schlegel (1734-1796) who had emigrated from Alsace.  Bedinger attended an English school. The family moved to Virginia about 1762 (where his elder brother Henry Bedinger (1753-1843) would remain). Meanwhile, the elder Bedinger moved the rest of his family to Kentucky in 1779, and settled at Boonesborough.

Military service

During the American Revolutionary War, George M. Bedinger served as adjutant in John Bowman's expedition against Chillicothe in May 1779. He returned to Virginia and served at the siege of Yorktown, and therefore missed the Battle of Blue Licks in Kentucky.
During the Northwest Indian War, he was a major in Drake's Regiment in 1791, a major commanding the Winchester Battalion  of Sharpshooters in the St. Clair expedition in 1791, and a major commanding the Third Sublegion of the United States Infantry from April 11, 1792, to February 28, 1793.

Career

Bedinger won election to the State house of representatives of the first legislature of Kentucky in 1792. He served in the State senate in 1800 and 1801.  He opposed Kentucky becoming a slave state, but was unsuccessful in this effort.

Bedinger was elected as a Democratic-Republican to the Eighth and Ninth Congresses (March 4, 1803 – March 3, 1807).
He engaged in agricultural pursuits.
While Bedinger inherited several slaves from his brother, he freed the slaves he owned personally when they reached the age of 30, and reportedly offered to pay for their passage to Liberia, though only one accepted.

Death and legcacy

Bedinger died at Blue Licks Springs, Kentucky, December 7, 1843.
He was interred in the family cemetery on his farm near Lower Blue Licks Springs, Kentucky.

References

 Retrieved on 2009-5-20

1756 births
1843 deaths
American people of the Northwest Indian War
George Michael
Kentucky state senators
Members of the Kentucky House of Representatives
People from Hanover, Pennsylvania
People of Kentucky in the American Revolution
People of Virginia in the American Revolution
Continental Army officers from Pennsylvania
Democratic-Republican Party members of the United States House of Representatives from Kentucky
People of colonial Pennsylvania
Burials in Kentucky